Application development may refer to:

 Mobile application development ("app development")
 The process of developing desktop application software
 Overlapping aspects of industrial research and development and sales engineering, in which commercial applications of technology are developed

See also
 Software development
 Android Application Development, see Android (operating system)